Sophie Vercruyssen (born 22 February 1992) is a Belgian bobsledder. She competed in the two-woman event at the 2018 Winter Olympics. She lives with her partner Lore Simons in Belgium.

References

External links
 

1992 births
Living people
Belgian female bobsledders
Olympic bobsledders of Belgium
Bobsledders at the 2018 Winter Olympics
Place of birth missing (living people)
Belgium LGBT sportspeople
Lesbian sportswomen
LGBT bobsledders